José Yulián Anchico Patiño (born 28 May 1984) is a  Colombian professional footballer who plays as central midfielder and right-back for Categoría Primera A club Jaguares de Córdoba. He has played for the Colombian U-20 national team, as well as the Colombia national football team.

Honours

Club 
Tolima
Categoría Primera A: 2003-II
Santa Fe
Copa Sudamericana: 2015
Categoría Primera A: 2012-I,2014-II
Copa Colombia: 2009
Superliga Colombiana : 2013, 2015

External links

1984 births
Living people
Colombian footballers
Association football midfielders
Colombia international footballers
Colombia under-20 international footballers
Colombian expatriate footballers
Independiente Santa Fe footballers
Deportes Tolima footballers
C.F. Pachuca players
Atlético Bucaramanga footballers
Jaguares de Córdoba footballers
Categoría Primera A players
Liga MX players
2005 CONCACAF Gold Cup players
2011 Copa América players
Colombian expatriate sportspeople in Mexico
Expatriate footballers in Mexico
People from Cúcuta